Zor Abu Dardaa al-Nashmi is a Syrian village located in the Subdistrict of the Hama District in the Hama Governorate. According to the Syria Central Bureau of Statistics (CBS), Zor Abu Dardaa al-Nashmi had a population of 302 in the 2004 census.

References 

Populated places in Hama District